This is a list of instruments by Hornbostel-Sachs number, covering those instruments that are classified under 111 under that system. These instruments are directly struck idiophones.

Castanets
Claves
Clash Cymbals
111.2 Percussion Idiophones
111.21 Percussion sticks or bars
Crystallophones:
Glass marimba
Glasschord
Triangle
Xylophones (strictly made of wood):
Balafon
Gandingan a kayo
Kulintang a kayo
Luntang or kwintangan kayo
Marimba
Marimbaphone (also bowed)
Pong lang
Xylorimba
111.22 Percussion plaque
Crotales
Lithophone
Metallophones:
Celesta
Fangxiang
Gangsa
Gendér
Glockenspiel
Kulintang a tiniok, kulintang a putao or sarunay
Ranat ek lek
Ranat thum lek
Toy piano
Ugal
Vibraphone
111.23 Percussion tube
Tubular bells or chimes
111.24 Vessels:
Cymbals
Crash cymbal
Hi-hat cymbal
Ride cymbal
Splash cymbal
Hang
Slit drums:
Agung a tamlang
Kagul or tagutok
Steelpan or steel drum
Tank drum
Udu (also an aerophone)
111.241 Gongs:
Agung or agong
Babendil
Gandingan
Kulintang or kolintang
111.242 Bells
Bell
Cowbell

References
 http://www.music.vt.edu/musicdictionary/texti/Idiophone.html
 https://web.archive.org/web/20110605070024/http://www.let.uu.nl/~Rudolf.Rasch/personal/Muziekinstrumenten03.PDF
 http://www.wesleyan.edu/vim/svh.html

Lists of musical instruments by Hornbostel–Sachs number
Lists of percussion instruments